Park Kwang-hyun (born 24 July 1967) was a South Korean football player.

Club career 
He played Hyundai Horangi, Ilhwa Chunma / Cheonan Ilhwa.

Internaltional career 
He made his debut for the South Korea  senior team in a 3–1 friendly match China on 25 September 1996.

References

External links
 

1967 births
Living people
Association football defenders
South Korean footballers
South Korea international footballers
Ulsan Hyundai FC players
Seongnam FC players
K League 1 players